Ted Nugent is the debut studio album by American rock musician Ted Nugent. The album was released in September 1975 by Epic Records. It was Nugent's first release after the disbanding from his former group The Amboy Dukes.

Background

Tired of The Amboy Dukes' lack of effort and discipline, Nugent decided he had enough and left the group. He took a three-month vacation (his first ever) clearing his head in the Colorado wilderness, spending his time deer hunting and enjoying the outdoors.
Renewed, Nugent returned to civilization in search of a new direction and a new band. Joining him in the Ted Nugent Band were former Amboy Duke Rob Grange on bass, along with Cliff Davies (ex-If) on drums and finally, from a local Michigan band called Scott which had opened for the Dukes previously, a singer/guitarist named Derek St. Holmes.

The new group hit the road and then the studio, forming the songs which would send their first album into the Billboard Top 30 and into the multi-platinum range. The first track, "Stranglehold", would set the stage for Nugent's career: an eight-minute plus guitar attack with vocals by St. Holmes and Nugent, a long solo played on Nugent's Gibson Byrdland guitar recorded in one take and a unique phase bass guitar effect by Grange. St. Holmes' sang tracks such as "Queen of the Forest", "Hey Baby", "Just What the Doctor Ordered" and "Snakeskin Cowboys", the latter featuring an 8-string Hagström bass played by Grange, which would prove to be staples of the band's concert tours for years to come. "Motor City Madhouse" is an ode to Ted's hometown of Detroit.

The album was produced by Tom Werman and former If manager Lew Futterman. Nugent said about the album, "If anyone wanted to know what rock 'n roll was all about, that's the only album they'd need".

"One had to recognize that there was a definite synergy between the band and Nugent", said producer Tom Werman.

Reception

In 2005, Ted Nugent was ranked number 487 in Rock Hard magazine's book The 500 Greatest Rock & Metal Albums of All Time.

"Stranglehold" has been ranked 31st greatest guitar solo of all time by Guitar World.

Track listing
All songs are credited as "written and arranged by Ted Nugent", except "Hey Baby", which is credited as "written and arranged by Derek St. Holmes". In Martin Popoff's book Epic Ted Nugent, Nugent admits that "Stranglehold" was co-written by Rob Grange, who never received a royalty share. Derek St. Holmes claims the album was co-written by the whole band, and that Nugent took sole credit as a way to not pay them royalties.

Personnel
Band members
Derek St. Holmes – lead vocals on all tracks except "Motor City Madhouse" and "You Make Me Feel Right at Home", rhythm guitar, arrangements
Ted Nugent – lead and rhythm guitar, backing vocals, percussion, arrangements, lead vocals on "Motor City Madhouse"
Rob Grange – bass, eight-string bass on "Snakeskin Cowboys", bass phase effect on "Stranglehold", arrangements
Cliff Davies – drums, vibraphone, backing vocals, arrangements, lead vocals on "You Make Me Feel Right at Home"

Additional musicians
Steve McRay – keyboard
Brian Staffeld – percussion
Tom Werman – percussion, producer

Production
Lew Futterman – producer
Anthony Reale – engineer, mixing
Howard Fritzson – art direction
Al Clayton – photography
Gerard Huerta – lettering
Bruce Dickinson – producer (1999 reissue)
Vic Anesini – remastering
Stephan Moore – 1999 reissue project director
Gary Graff – 1999 reissue liner notes

Charts

Weekly charts

Year-end charts

Singles

Certifications

References

External links
Official Ted Nugent website

1975 debut albums
Ted Nugent albums
Epic Records albums
Albums produced by Tom Werman